Khud Parast is a 2018 Pakistani romantic drama serial that premiered on 6 October 2018 on ARY Digital. It is directed by Aabis Raza and written by Radain Shah. It stars Shehzad Sheikh and Ramsha Khan in lead roles. The serial is produced by Fahad Mustafa and Dr. Ali Kazmi under their production banner Big Bang Entertainment.

Cast  
Shehzad Sheikh as Hanaan
Ramsha Khan as Uswah
Nausheen Shah as Beenish
Asma Abbas as Bakhtawar, Hannan's mother
Sajida Syed as Zarina, Uswah's mother
Yasmeen Haq as Maria, Uswah's sister
Hassan Ahmed as Moiz
Saife Hassan as Saad, elder brother of Uswah
Sabahat Adil as Zoya, Saad's wife
Aamir Qureshi as Umer, Uswah's younger brother
 Fahad Shaikh as Adeel
 Faiza Gillani as Sadia, Umer's wife
 Gul e Rana as Beenish's mother
 Agha Talal

Awards and nominations

References

External links
 Official website

Pakistani drama television series
2018 Pakistani television series debuts
2019 Pakistani television series endings
Urdu-language television shows
ARY Digital original programming